Paderno may refer to:

Paderno Dugnano, in the province of Milano, Italy
Paderno d'Adda, in the province of Lecco, Italy
Paderno Franciacorta, in the province of Brescia, Italy
Paderno Ponchielli, in the province of Cremona, Italy
Paderno del Grappa, in the province of Treviso, Italy